Dubai Dolphinarium is the first fully air-conditioned indoor dolphinarium in the Middle East, providing habitat to dolphins and seals, allowing the public to watch and interact with them through live shows and photo sessions. It is located in the creek side park at Bur Dubai near the Children's City. Dubai Dolphinarium was opened on May 21, 2008 by Dubai Municipality, and is sponsored and supported by Dubai government to provide the general public with entertainment and also educate them regarding dolphins, seals and other marine organisms. It was also reflected that interacting with such friendly mammals like dolphins will motivate young generation to protect marine life and the environment.

Facilities 

Dubai Dolphinarium is a  modern marine facility with around 1250 seating capacity. There is a separate medical pool and seal pool constructed considering well-being of these marine mammals.

The dolphinarium complex also features group and kids activities, birthday parties for kids, school field trips, group events, trampoline, swim with dolphins, mirror maze, bird show, a restaurant providing quick and fun meals for kids and a mini 5-D & 7D cinema theater.

Marine mammals 

Dubai Dolphinarium is home to bottlenose dolphins and Northern fur seals. These dolphins and seals were reportedly bought from a country belonging to the Commonwealth of Independent States, an alliance of 11 former Soviet republics.

Activities 

Various activities like kids summer camp and Dubai Summer Surprises are held at the Dubai Dolphinarium every year during summer holidays.

Dubai Dolphinarium in association with Dubai Municipality organized an Autism Awareness Day from various autism care centres and training centres for children with special needs on April 28, 2011.

Dubai Dolphinarium welcomed its one millionth visitor during March, 2012 and various promotional activities were featured during this period.

Management 

This establishment is managed by a staff of 60 including mammal trainers and customer supporting staff.

Criticisms 

Dubai Dolphinarium had come under criticism from various animal welfare campaigners in the beginning saying, it would lead to suffering and high dolphin mortality. Activists also questioned the source of its black sea bottlenose dolphins, claiming that one of them was not born in captivity but rescued from fishermen's nets, and therefore should have been re-released.

However the management has countered these criticisms stating that the dolphins in Dubai Dolphinarium are third generation dolphins who were born in artificial conditions and are perfectly happy in their current environment and role, and are healthier all year round than their wild counterparts.

See also 
 Al Ain Zoo
 Al Hefaiyah Conservation Centre
 Emirates Park Zoo
 Breeding Centre for Endangered Wildlife, Sharjah
 Dubai Safari Park
 Dubai Zoo
 Tourism in Dubai
 Tourist attractions in Dubai

References

External links 

Aquaria in the United Arab Emirates
Buildings and structures in Dubai
Tourist attractions in Dubai
2008 establishments in the United Arab Emirates
Zoos in the United Arab Emirates
Dolphinariums
Zoos established in 2008